Atlantic Technical College, located in Coconut Creek, Florida is a public, secondary and post-secondary institution in Broward County, Florida.

History
The school was built in 1973 known as Atlantic Vocational Center (changed to its current name since 2014), serving vocational education to 450 adult students with 11 programs of instruction. Years later, more construction phases were made to keep pace with more programs being added, community growth, and labor market demands. More than 8,000 students attend classes offered during the day, night, and Saturday mornings. In August 2002, Atlantic Technical College added its own magnet high school starting with a class of 150 students. Another 150 students were added each year bringing a total of 600 students. The first class to graduate there was in 2006. In 2010, the school was awarded silver medal by U.S. News & World Report for the "America's Best High Schools" for three consecutive years. In 2014, the School Board of Broward County, Florida officially changed the name to Atlantic Technical College.

Occupational programs

Atlantic Technical College offers seven different kinds of occupational programs, which include: Automotive & Transportation Technology, Business Management and Administration, Health Sciences, Hospitality and Tourism, Information Technology, Manufacturing,.

High school demographics
As of the 2021–22 school year, the total student enrollment was 678. The ethnic makeup of the school was 37.2% White, 52.7% Black, 26.7% Hispanic, 3.7% Asian, 0.6% Pacific Islander, 4.7% Multiracial, and 1.2% Native American or Native Alaskan. Note that the adult enrollment in this school is not reflected in the total student enrollment number.

References

High schools in Broward County, Florida
Educational institutions accredited by the Council on Occupational Education
Coconut Creek, Florida
Broward County Public Schools
1973 establishments in Florida
Educational institutions established in 1973